Double Spring Knob, with an elevation of , is tied with Coosa Bald as the tenth-highest peak in Georgia, USA. It is located in two Georgia counties - Rabun and Towns. It is located within the boundaries of the Chattahoochee National Forest.  The Appalachian Trail passes below the knob to the east.  This mountain is also known as Kelly Knob.

See also
List of mountains in Georgia (U.S. state)

External links 
TopoQuest map of Double Spring Knob
100 highest peaks in Georgia
Georgia peaks over 4,000 feet

Mountains of Georgia (U.S. state)
Mountains of Rabun County, Georgia
Mountains of Towns County, Georgia
Chattahoochee-Oconee National Forest